Cardiff Butt, better known as General Degree (or simply Degree) and later as Snapple Dapple, is a Jamaican dancehall deejay and record producer.

Biography
Born in Manchester, Jamaica, Degree worked as a tailor before beginning his career in music in the late 1980s, his stage name reflecting the influence of General Trees. He had success through the 1990s with singles such as "Mother Rude Pickney", "Granny", "Mr. Do It Nice", "When I Hold You Tonight", "Bodyguard", "Papa Lover", "Traffic Blocking", "Boom Boom", and "Inna Body". His lyrics are often sexually explicit and humorous, containing double entendres such as on his single "Pianist".

In 1997 he was featured on Richie Stephens' "Come Give Me Your Love", which reached number 61 on the UK Singles Chart.

He also has his own 'Size 8 Record' label. Since 2000 he has spent much of his time on production work, under the name 'Snapple Dapple'. In 2006 he launched his own 'Reh Geh' clothing range. In 2008 he was one of the judges in the 'Magnum Kings and Queens of Dancehall' contest. Since 2005 he has held the annual 'Manchester Fiesta' show.

His first album since 2007's Generally Speaking, Snapple Dapple Volume 1, was released in 2012, with a promotional tour of Europe following.

In January 2015 he released the one-drop reggae EP Feeling Irie.

Discography

Albums
Granny (1992), VP
P'N'S (1994), VP
Ninety Degrees (1994), Pipper/King Dragon
Degree (1997), VP
Bush Baby (1998), VP
Fi Real (1999), Pretty Boy
Yeah Man (2001), Greensleeves
The General (2004), Size 8
Generally Speaking (2007), Kingstone
Snapple Dapple Volume 1 (2012)

Compilations
Smash Hits (2002), Size 8

Split albums
Battle Of The Generals (1990), King Dragon - with General Trees

EPs
Feeling Irie (2015)
Money Language Refix (2022)

References

Living people
Jamaican dancehall musicians
Jamaican male singers
Year of birth missing (living people)
VP Records artists
Greensleeves Records artists